Wil Dasovich (born August 26, 1991), is a Filipino-American television personality, model, and vlogger. He is known for his vlogs on YouTube. He has appeared on various television shows but most notably on Pinoy Big Brother.

Early life
Dasovich was born in California to an American father of Irish and Croatian descent , Steve Dasovich, and a Filipino mother, Charry Lising. His father was a merchant mariner while his mother is a registered nurse. Dasovich was raised in Novato, California, just north of San Francisco. He has an older sister named Haley Lising Dasovich, who is also a vlogger. Dasovich is a nephew of ABS-CBN news presenter Karen Davila.

He attended California Polytechnic State University in San Luis Obispo, California with Dylan Efron, Zac Efron's little brother.  He studied business and was accepted into an entrepreneurial internship program. In his third year of college, he started his own residential painting business, operating it for nearly two years.

Career

Modeling
After graduating from college in 2013, Dasovich travelled around Asia for three months. When he came to the Philippines, he decided to stay to learn its language and culture after his growing fondness for his Filipino heritage.

During the same year, while having lunch at Greenbelt in Makati, he was discovered and offered a job as a commercial model. For the next two years he appeared in several advertisements in both print and video. He would eventually make his way to local television. After being exposed to showbiz, and finding some success as a host and TV personality, he decided to remain in the Philippines and pursue his career in the entertainment industry. He eventually fully committed to YouTube focusing all his efforts on creating content. The first video he posted is called 10 Hours of Walking in Manila.

YouTube
Dasovich gained recognition when his videos with his father, Steve Dasovich, speaking Swardspeak or "bekinese" went viral. He often features different aspects of Filipino culture, which he discovers during his travels around the country.

Work with Janina Vela
In 2016, Dasovich and fellow YouTuber Janina Vela were the two fastest growing vloggers in the Philippines. He and Vela became brand endorsers for Jollibee. They performed together at the 2016 YouTube FanFest in Manila. The pair has produced several collaborative videos mostly of food reviews and interviews with one another.

Vlogging group
Dasovich started a vlogging group called the "#VlogSquad" (not to be confused with David Dobrik's "The Vlog Squad") with fellow YouTubers Daniel Marsh and his sister Haley Dasovich. The three have appeared together in numerous travel vlogs on their respective YouTube channels. As a group they have been endorsers of many large companies including Coca-Cola, Converse, Jollibee, Forever 21 and many other notable brands. "The Vlog Squad" is managed by producer and YouTuber (PaperBugTV) Jako de Leon. Over time, Dasovich introduced vlogging to many other influencers and TV personalities including fellow Big Brother housemate Baninay Bautista, who became a later addition to the squad. Also part of the team is Elvin Mendoza who is the VlogSquad's IT person in charge of all the technical tasks and uploading behind-the-scene videos of the team. The squad, featuring Dasovich, Haley, and Daniel, appear in an international ad campaign for Coca-Cola.

Big Brother

Dasovich became a contestant on the thirteenth season of Pinoy Big Brother after a successful third audition. He had previously attempted to enter the show, but failed to make the cut twice.

During his residence in the Big Brother house, he was nominated for every eviction night but survived by succeeding at save challenges or getting the highest number of text votes. He was evicted after being nominated for the fifth time after garnering the second-lowest text votes.

Spotify
On Valentine's Day of 2021, Dasovich launched his podcast named Superhuman on Spotify. Produced by Dasovich himself, the podcast tackles health and motivation as best inspired by his experiences being diagnosed with cancer in 2017.

Controversy
In July 2020, in the second episode of Nas Talks podcast hosted by Palestinian-Israeli vlogger Nuseir Yassin (more commonly known as Nas Daily), Dasovich and Yassin were discussing the role of content creators when the latter brought out the ABS-CBN franchise renewal controversy at one point. Seeking an answer, Dasovich responded by saying he distances himself from politics as they're "always gonna upset a huge group of people." This remark was met with backlash from Twitter users for apparently advocating "toxic positivity" and choosing to stay away from politics. Addressing the backlash and the trend, Dasovich addressed the controversy through his vlog for his statements, he said, were taken out of context stating that Yassin was not literally talking about the network's shutdown, but about "if something bigger happened."

Personal life
In August 2017, upon returning to San Francisco after three years abroad, Dasovich explained that he came for treatment for internal bleeding that was apparently contracted from a parasite. He later revealed that he was diagnosed with a stage III colon cancer. He finished his last cycle of chemotherapy in early January 2018. In early February 2018, he revealed that he is cancer-free.

On February 14, 2018, Dasovich confirmed that he and Alodia Gosiengfiao had begun a relationship. In November 14, 2021, Gosiengfiao posted her confirmation through her Facebook page that she and Dasovich have broken up.

On April 15, 2018, he won the Shorty Awards' Vlogger of the Year.

Filmography

Television

Film

Awards and nominations

References

External links
 
 
 
 

1991 births
Living people
American people of Filipino descent
American YouTubers
California Polytechnic State University alumni
Filipino male models
Filipino people of American descent
Filipino YouTubers
Male models from California
People from Novato, California
Pinoy Big Brother contestants
Video bloggers
Male bloggers
Shorty Award winners